The Centre line refers to a set of positions on an Australian rules football field.
It consists of 3 players, two on the wings (left and right), and one in the centre.

Wing
The two wingmen control the open spaces in the middle of the ground. They can vary in size, depending on team balance or opposition match-ups, but in general they need to be highly skilled, especially in kicking. Wingmen also require considerable pace and stamina, as they run up and down the ground linking play between defence and attack. The Victorian Football Association (VFA) abolished the wing role for many years, which sped up play and increased the average team score. However, this was not copied in other leagues.

Notable wingmen in Australian football over the years include:
 Wilfred "Chicken" Smallhorn (1930-1940), Brownlow Medallist 1933
 Herb Matthews (1932-1945), Brownlow Medallist 1940
 Thorold Merrett (1950-1960)
 Dick Clay (1966-1976)
 Keith Greig (North Melbourne, 1971-1985), Brownlow Medallist 1973, 1974 and also named on wing in AFL Team of the Century (1996)
 Robbie Flower (Melbourne, 1973-1987)
 Michael Turner (1974-1988)
 Robert DiPierdomenico (Hawthorn, 1975-1991), Brownlow Medallist 1986
 Dennis Carroll (1981-1991)
 Darren Millane (Collingwood, 1984-1991)
 Chris Mainwaring (1987-1999)
 Peter Matera (West Coast, 1990-2002) Norm Smith Medallist 1992
 Peter Riccardi (Geelong, 1992-2006)

Centre
The centre player usually consists of a hard-running midfielder capable of feeding outside running teammates.

Notable centres in Australian football over the years include:
 Jock McHale (1903-1920)
 Edward "Carji" Greeves (1923-1933), inaugural winner of the Brownlow Medal in 1924
 Allan Hopkins (1925-1934), Brownlow Medallist 1930
 Allan La Fontaine (1934-1945)
 Jack Clarke (Australian footballer, born 1933) (1951-1967)
 Denis Marshall ( and Geelong, 1958-1972)
 Russell Ebert ( and North Melbourne, 1968-1985), Magarey Medallist 1971, 1974, 1976, 1980
 Tony Shaw (Collingwood, 1977-1994), Norm Smith Medallist 1990
 Terry Wallace (Richmond and Footscray, 1978-1991)
 Garry McIntosh (1982-1998), Magarey Medallist 1994, 1995
 Paul Couch (Geelong, 1985-1997), Brownlow Medallist 1989
 Nathan Buckley (Port Adelaide Magpies,  and Collingwood, 1991-2007), Magarey Medallist 1992; Norm Smith Medallist 2002; Brownlow Medallist 2003
 Michael Voss
 Mark McVeigh
 Mark Ricciuto
 Ben Cousins
 James Hird
 Shane Crawford
 Scott West
 Jobe Watson
 Chris Judd

References

Bibliography

Australian rules football terminology